Armin Guhl (14 September 1907 – 13 November 1981) was a Swiss athlete. He competed in the men's decathlon at the 1936 Summer Olympics.

References

External links

1907 births
1981 deaths
Athletes (track and field) at the 1936 Summer Olympics
Swiss decathletes
Olympic athletes of Switzerland
Place of birth missing